The National Association of Credit Management (NACM) is a non-profit organization based in Columbia, Maryland that promotes standards for the business-to-business credit profession. Founded in 1896, NACM has more than 15,000 members, primarily of credit and financial executives representing manufacturers, wholesalers, financial institutions, and service organizations. The trade association specializes in education for its membership, advancement of credit industry practices as well as business credit and accounts receivable management products and services.

NACM has been active in its advocacy agenda for more than 100 years in Washington, DC, lobbying during the crafting of relevant legislation. Among its recent federal legislative priority issues were bankruptcy reform, the Federal Trade Commission’s “Red Flags Rules” and the 3% withholding tax issues.

NACM’s education, training and professional certification programs include the Credit Business Associate (CBA), Credit Business Fellow (CBF), the Certified Credit and Risk Analyst (CCRA) and Certified Credit Executive (CCE) designations, among others.

The association’s international arm is Finance, Credit & International Business (FCIB). FCIB provides education, seminars, credit groups and reporting designed for the international credit professional. In 2011, the division launched its “Doing Business in…” series to highlight key details of credit and collections dealings, notably for emerging economies such as Brazil, China and South Korea.

The newest NACM division is its "Mechanic’s Lien and Bond Services" division, which includes information and services pertaining to various commercial construction-related matters as well as state and federal laws governing lien and bond rights and processes.

NACM’s annual conference, Credit Congress, is the industry's largest gathering of credit professionals. Robin Schauseil is the group's president. The current national chairman is DeAnna Leahy, CCE.

NACM produces the monthly Credit Managers' Index, an economic indicator compiled through a poll of credit and financial professionals.

References

Lobbying organizations in the United States
Companies based in Columbia, Maryland
Financial management organizations